The Lululemon murder occurred on March 11, 2011, at a Lululemon Athletica store located in the Washington, D.C. suburb of Bethesda, Maryland, when Brittany Norwood, a store worker, murdered her coworker Jayna Troxel Murray. The case received widespread media coverage and was commonly referred to as the "Lululemon murder." In January 2012, Norwood was sentenced to life imprisonment without possibility of parole.

Murder 
On March 12, 2011, a manager arrived in the morning to find the door unlocked, merchandise strewn across the floor, and mannequins in disarray. She could hear someone moaning near the back of the store. Frightened, she asked a man outside to help her search the store. He found Jayna Murray lying in a back hallway, face down in a pool of blood, with a ligature around her neck. Brittany Norwood was found in the bathroom, apparently semi-conscious, with zipties binding her wrists and ankles and blood on her face. Bloody footprints were tracked through the store.  

Norwood told police that after she and Murray had closed the store the previous evening, she realized that she had forgotten her wallet and called Murray to let her back into the store. Alarm records showed that the door was unlocked at 10:05pm. Then, according to Norwood, two men wearing dark clothing and ski masks entered the store, attacked them, and sexually assaulted them.  While police initially treated Norwood as a victim, it soon became clear that the evidence did not support her account. Murray had been savagely attacked, sustaining at least 331 wounds from at least five different weapons, including a knife and a hammer, which may have come from a toolbox in the store. Norwood's injuries were relatively minor, and appeared to be consistent with self-inflicted wounds. A forensic expert at the trial testified that the blood on her face, from a cut on her forehead, had dripped straight down, suggesting that she had been upright most of the night, not lying on the bathroom floor where she was found. The bloody footprints in the store came from two pairs of shoes—a pair of men's size 14 Reebok sneakers, which were found inside the store, and Norwood's own shoes. Additionally, the tracks ended before either exit from the store. Nor did investigators find evidence that either woman had been sexually assaulted, though Norwood had cut a hole in Murray's pants to make it appear that she had been. 

During the investigation, it emerged that an employee and manager at the Apple Store next door had heard an altercation through the wall the previous evening; surveillance footage from inside the Apple Store shows them standing next to the shared wall, then walking away, while a security guard sits nearby listening to music on an iPod. The employee testified at Norwood's trial that she heard women arguing, one saying "Talk to me. Don't do this. Talk to me. What's going on?", followed by screams, sounds of something or someone being hit or dragged, and a weak voice saying "God help me...please help me." The manager testified that he thought the noise was "just drama." 

Police also found blood in Murray's car, which was identified at the trial as a mix of Norwood's blood and Murray's. When they asked Norwood whether she had moved the car, which was found at a farmer's market three blocks away, she admitted that she had, but said that the men inside had ordered her to, and told her that if she didn't come back in 10 minutes, they would kill her. She also said that she had seen a police officer while she was moving the vehicle, but hadn't spoken to him. 

Norwood was arrested a week after the slaying, and charged with first-degree murder. Statements by police officials and testimony during the trial indicated that on the evening of the murder, Murray and Norwood checked each others' bags for unpaid merchandise, a routine security procedure at Lululemon and other retail stores. Murray found a pair of pants in Norwood's bag, and called their manager after she left the store. The manager said she would deal with it in the morning. A few minutes later, Norwood called Murray to say she'd forgotten something, and asked Murray to return to the store and let her in. When Murray arrived, Norwood attacked her, moved her car, then staged the scene to look like a robbery, putting on a pair of men's shoes to track blood across the floor; tossing mops, broom, and chairs around the store; and finally cutting herself and binding her own wrists and ankles with zipties. 

In January of 2012, Brittany Norwood was sentenced to life in prison for first degree murder.

In the Media
The murder has been covered in a number of true crime podcasts, including Morbid and Generation Why. It was also the subject of a 2012 episode of Snapped, a 2014 episode of Redrum and a 2023 episode of Autopsy.

In 2013, Washington Post police reporter Dan Morse published the book, The Yoga Store Murder: The Shocking True Account of the Lululemon Athletica Killing.

See also 
 Starbucks murders
 Crime in Maryland

References 

2011 in Maryland
2011 murders in the United States
2012 in Maryland
Crime in Maryland
Female murder victims
Lululemon Athletica
Murder in Maryland
Deaths by stabbing in the United States
History of women in Maryland
March 2011 crimes in the United States